The Toronto West Detention Centre was a maximum security remand facility located in Rexdale, a community located in the north-west corner of Toronto, Ontario, Canada. The facility was known as the Metropolitan Toronto West Detention Centre until Rexdale, as part of the City of Etobicoke, became part of the newly amalgamated City of Toronto in 1998.

With a designed capacity for 631 prisoners, the Toronto West Detention Centre housed adult males who had been remanded into custody while awaiting trial or sentencing, were serving short sentences, or were awaiting transfer to federal or provincial correctional facilities. Over the years the Toronto West Detention Centre had at times also housed female and juvenile offenders. From October 1997 through January 1999 the facility underwent extensive retrofitting of its security systems using up-to-date technology. The facility has also housed foreign nationals being detained on security certificates.

In January 2014 the Toronto South Detention Centre opened to replace the Toronto West Detention Centre and the Toronto Jail (Don Jail). The Toronto Jail was demolished and is now a vacant site situated beside the new hospital facility.

Demolition of the Toronto West Detention Centre commenced in December 2016 with a projected finish of February 2017. The 111 Disco road site is slated to become the home of the new Toronto Young Offender Facility.

Notable prisoners

Karla Homolka, Canadian serial killer, co-accused with her then husband Paul Bernardo 
Abdullah Khadr, awaiting extradition, 2004–current.
Laurie Bembenek, also known as Bambi Bembenek.
Karlheinz Schreiber, the German-Canadian businessman who is embroiled in a dispute with former Canadian Prime Minister Brian Mulroney.; later extradited to Germany
Hassan Almrei, a Syrian national, who came to Canada in 1999 on a forged passport and was alleged to have been involved in an al Qaeda forgery ring.
Ernst Zündel, was held at Toronto West from 2003 until his 2005 deportation

See also 
List of correctional facilities in Ontario

References

Demolished buildings and structures in Toronto
Etobicoke
Defunct prisons in Ontario
Buildings and structures demolished in 2016
2014 disestablishments in Ontario
1976 establishments in Ontario